Sylvie Roke (born 1977 in De Bilt, Netherlands) is a Dutch chemist and physicist specialized in photonics and aqueous systems. As a full professor she holds Julia Jacobi Chair of Photomedicine at EPFL (École Polytechnique Fédérale de Lausanne) and is the director of the Laboratory for fundamental BioPhotonics.

Career 
Roke studied chemistry and experimental physics at Utrecht University and graduated in 2000 with honors. Roke studied in Utrecht, graduating from Utrecht University with degrees in chemistry (1995-2000, highest honors) and experimental physics (1997-2000, highest honors). She joined Aart W. Kleyn's Molecular Beams Group at the Institute for Atomic and Molecular Physics (AMOLF) to work on her extended master research project studying the interactions of small molecules with metal surfaces under ultrahigh vacuum conditions. Alfons van Blaaderen (chemistry) and Albert Polman (physics) where her thesis supervisors from Utrecht University. She continued as a PhD student in the Kleyn group moving to Leiden University. In 2004, she graduated with highest honors with thesis co-supervised by Mischa Bonn on "New light on hidden surfaces."

As a postdoctoral student she joined first the FOM Institute for Plasma Physics in Nieuwegein, and thereafter she worked as an Alexander von Humboldt Fellow with Michael Grunze at the Institute of Applied Physical Chemistry at Heidelberg University. In 2005, enabled by a Floating Research Group Leader position and the opportunity to set up her own laboratory from the Max-Planck Society, she moved to the Max Planck Institute for Metals Research in Stuttgart.

In 2011, she joined  EPFL first as an assistant professor and was promoted as full professor in 2015. She is the holder of the Julia Jacobi Chair in Photomedicine, and the director of the Laboratory for fundamental BioPhotonics with affiliations both at the Institutes of Bioengineering and Materials (IMX) at the Schools of Engineering and of Life Sciences. In 2021, she became the director of the Institute of Bioengineering.

Research 

Roke performs theoretical research and develops non-invasive label-free optical tools for the probing of aqueous systems and interfaces. Her research aims at understanding the properties of water on molecular level in diverse systems such as in aqueous electrolyte and polyelectrolyte solutions, at buried interfaces, in and outside droplets, in curved nanoscale and microscale membranes, in pores and in living cells such as neurons.

To elucidate molecular surface structures, morphologies and chirality of nano- and microscopic objects in solutions, Roke invented vibrational sum frequency scattering (SFS), a method that allows the recording the vibrational spectrum of the molecular interfacial layer around objects. She used SFS to specify the molecular interfaces of complex systems: polymer particles in a solid matrix, particles in solution, oil droplets in water (emulsions), lipid droplet like systems, water droplets, a micro-jet and liposomes in aqueous solution. Her studies indicate that objects on nano- and microscale show different behaviors as model planar interfaces.

Roke has also developed high throughput polarimetric angle resolved second harmonic scattering (AR-SHS), a method allowing for probing particle interfaces and liquids. Making use of non-resonant second harmonic response of water and its response to electrostatic fields, Roke developed a method to determine the surface potential from particle interfaces and the amount of oriented water.

By investigating aqueous solutions, she discovered long-range interactions of ions and water that stem from the influence of the ionic electrostatic field on the water-water hydrogen bonds. Roke found that these interactions are amplified in viscoelastic liquids made of polyelectrolytes such Hyaluronan, and furthermore correlate with the viscosity of such liquids. She developed high-throughput wide field multiphoton microscopy with an about thousand fold increased signal to noise ratio when compared to standard multiphoton confocal imaging systems. A further advantage of this method is a reduction of the photodamage effect in living cells. This allows for the spatiotemporal imaging of interfacial water in various systems: imaging water undergoing surface chemical reactions, electro-catalysis, membrane water and the restructuring of water inside ion channels and activated living mammalian neurons. The latter enables a new way of measuring membrane potentials and ion fluxes in neurons using water as a probe.

Distinctions 
Roke is the winner for several ERC grants: ERC Synergy Grant (2020; with Aurélien Roux, University of Geneva), ERC Proof of Concept Grant (2020), ERC Consolidator Grant (2014), ERC Startup Grant (2009)

She is an elected fellow of the American Physical Society (APS; 2020). She is a fellow of the Young Academy of the Berlin-Brandenburg Academy of Sciences and Humanities (2010) and the German Academy of Natural Scientists, Leopoldina (2010), a young fellow at the Werner von Siemens Ring, and was selected for the Excellence Network of the Robert-Bosch Foundation.

She is the recipient of the Hertha-Sponer-Preis of the German Physical Society (2008), the Minerva Prize by the Dutch Foundation for Fundamental Research on Matter (2006), and the L. J. Oosterhoff prize by the Leiden University.

Roke has been involved in the creation of the start-up companies ORYL photonics and Matis.

Selected works

References

External links 
 
 Website of the Laboratory for fundamental BioPhotonics (LBP)
Website of ORYL photonics

1977 births
Living people
Utrecht University alumni
Leiden University alumni
Academic staff of the École Polytechnique Fédérale de Lausanne
Dutch women chemists
Dutch women physicists
Fellows of the American Physical Society
People from De Bilt
Dutch expatriates in Switzerland
21st-century women scientists